This is a list of electoral district results for the 1980 Queensland state election.

Results by electoral district

Albert

Archerfield

Ashgrove

Aspley

Auburn

Balonne

Barambah

Barron River

Brisbane Central

Bulimba

Bundaberg

Burdekin

Burnett

Caboolture

Cairns

Callide

Carnarvon

Chatsworth

Condamine

Cook

Cooroora

Cunningham

Everton

Fassifern

Flinders

Greenslopes

Gregory

Gympie

Hinchinbrook

Ipswich

Ipswich West

Isis

Ithaca

Kurilpa

Landsborough

Lockyer

Lytton

Mackay

Mansfield

Maryborough

Merthyr

Mirani

Mount Coot-tha 

 The two party preferred vote was not counted between the Liberal and Democrat candidates for Mount Coot-tha.

Mount Gravatt

Mount Isa

Mourilyan

Mulgrave

Murrumba

Nudgee

Nundah

Peak Downs

Pine Rivers

Port Curtis

Redcliffe

Redlands

Rockhampton

Rockhampton North

Roma

Salisbury

Sandgate

Sherwood

Somerset

South Brisbane

South Coast

Southport

Stafford

Surfers Paradise

Toowong

Toowoomba North

Toowoomba South

Townsville

Townsville South

Townsville West

Warrego

Warwick

Wavell

Whitsunday

Windsor

Wolston

Woodridge

Wynnum

Yeronga

See also 

1980 Queensland state election
Members of the Queensland Legislative Assembly, 1980-1983

References 

Results of Queensland elections